Weisbach is a surname. Notable people with the name include:

Julius Weisbach (1806–1871), German mathematician and engineer
Michael S. Weisbach, American economist
Raimund Weisbach (1886–1970), American soldier
Werner Weisbach (1873–1953), German-Swiss art historian

See also
Darcy–Weisbach equation